William is a male given name of Germanic origin. It became very popular in the English language after the Norman conquest of England in 1066, and remained so throughout the Middle Ages and into the modern era. It is sometimes abbreviated "Wm."  Shortened familiar versions in English include Will, Wills, Willy, Willie, Bill, and Billy. A common Irish form is Liam. Scottish diminutives include Wull, Willie or Wullie (as in Oor Wullie or the play Douglas). Female forms are Willa, Willemina, Wilma and Wilhelmina.

Etymology
William is related to the given name Wilhelm (cf. Proto-Germanic ᚹᛁᛚᛃᚨᚺᛖᛚᛗᚨᛉ, *Wiljahelmaz > German Wilhelm and Old Norse Vilhjalmr). By regular sound changes, the native, inherited English form of the name should be *Wilhelm as well (although the name is not actually attested in the history of English, and the Anglo-Saxon Chronicle refers to William the Conqueror as Willelm). That is a compound of two distinct elements: wil = "will or desire"; helm; Old English helm "helmet, protection"; English helm "knight's large helmet".

The form William is identified as typical of the Old Norman form Williame, Willame, because first, the English language should have retained (h)elm (see common words helm, helmet, in French heaume), second, -iaume [iaʷm] (typical of Popular French, see Guillaume) turned to -iame [iam] (typical of some Norman and Picard dialects) > English -iam. Historically, there was first a triphthongation of -elm (early Gallo-Romance form WILLELMU) into [iaʷ] + [m] in Old Norman-French, quite similar in Old Central French [eaʷ] + [m]. Then, the triphthong -iau was submitted to a monophthongation localized on the second part of the triphthong áu > āò > ā. For instance, this development can be followed in the different versions of the name in the Wace's Roman de Rou. or in the Cauchois variant forms of common words such as osias (plural of osè "bird", older oisel) / Regular Norman oisiaus "birds" (French sing. oiseau, pl. oiseaux).

The spelling and phonetics Wi- [wi] is a characteristic trait of the Northern French dialects, but the pronunciation changed in Norman from [wi] to [vi] in the 12th century (cf. the Norman surnames Villon and Villamaux "little William"), unlike the Central French and Southern Norman that turned the Germanic Wi- into Gui- [gwi] > [gi].

The first well-known carrier of the name was Charlemagne's cousin William of Gellone, a.k.a. Guilhem, William of Orange, Guillaume Fierabrace, or William Short-Nose (755–812). This William is immortalized in the Chanson de Guillaume and his esteem may account for the name's subsequent popularity among European nobility.

English history

The English "William" is taken from the Anglo-Norman language and was transmitted to England after the Norman conquest in the 11th century, and soon became the most popular name in England, along with other Norman names such as Robert (the English cognate was Hrēodbeorht, which by regular sound changes would have developed into something along the lines of "Reedbart"), Richard, Roger (the English cognate was Hroðgar), Henry (all of Germanic origin and may have been transmitted through the Normans' use of Old French).

The name Wilkin/Wilkins is also of medieval origin, taken from the shortened version of William (Will) with the suffix "kin" added.

Variants

Wilem, Awilemam (Koromfe)
Weelum (Scots)
Willum (Scots)
Viliamu (Samoan)
Viliami (Tongan)
Whiriyamu (Karanga)
Whiliyamu (Ndebele)
Wilhelm (German, Polish, Swedish)
Willem, Wilhelmus (Dutch, Frisian, Low German)
Willem, Wilhelm (Afrikaans)
Wiremu (Maori)
Willelm (Old English) 
Williama (Hawaiian)
Wellëm (Luxembourgish)
Walaam (Persian)
Wiliyom, Wiliyem (Bengali)
Vĩnh Liêm, Vĩnh Lâm (Vietnamese)
Billem (Toba Batak)
Cuglierme (Neapolitan)
Golem, Gulielm, Ylli, Ylmer (Albanian)
Gilen, Guilen (Basque)
Gulielmus, Vilhelmus, Willelmus, Gullelmus, Gullielmus, Villelmus (Latin)
Guglielmo (Italian)
Guillaume (French)
Guildhelm (Old Dutch)
Guilhem (Occitan)
Guillem, Guim (Catalan)
Guillén (Aragonese)
Guillermo (Spanish)
Guilherme (Portuguese)
Guillerme (Galician)
Gwilym (Welsh)
Gwilherm (Breton)
Gugghiermu (Sicilian)
Gllâome (Modern Norman)
Uilliam (Irish)
Liam (Irish)
Illiam (Manx Gaelic)
Uilleam (Scottish Gaelic)
وِلْيَم – William (Arabic)
Уилиам – Uiliam (Bulgarian)
װֶעלװֶעל – /ˈvelvel/ (Yiddish)
Villem, Villu (Estonian)
Вильгельм, Уильям – Vil'gel'm, Uil'yam (Russian)
Вільгельм, Вільям – Vil'hel'm, Vil'yam (Ukrainian)
Уільям, Вільям – Uiĺjam, Viĺjam (Belarusian)
Villem – Estonian
Vilhelm (Danish, Norwegian, Romanian, Swedish)
Vilhelmo (Esperanto)
Vilhelms (Latvian)
Viliam (Slovak)
Viljem (Slovene)
ויליאם – /ˈviljam/ (older propronunciation), /ˈwiljam/ (contemporary) (Hebrew)
Vilim (Croatian)
Вилим (Serbian)
Vilém (Czech)
Vilmos (Hungarian)
Viljams, Vilhelms, Vilis (Latvian)
Vilius, Viliumas, Vilhelmas (Lithuanian)
Viljami, Ville, Vilho, Viljo (Finnish)
Vilhjálmur (Icelandic)
Vilhjálmur, Viljormur (Faroese)
Vilhjalmr (Old Norse)
Vilko (Croatian)
Vilyam, Vilyım (Turkish)
Vėljams (Samogitian)
Γουλιέλμος (Wouliélmos) (Greek)
ܘܠܝܡ (Wil-yam) (Assyrian)
Գուլիելմոս (Goulielmós) (Armenian)

People named William

See also

Williams (surname)
Bill (disambiguation)
Billy (disambiguation)
King William (disambiguation)
Saint William (disambiguation)
Wilhelm (disambiguation)

References

English-language masculine given names
English masculine given names